Christian Pollas (b. 1947) is a French astronomer, known for the discovery and observation of minor planets and  supernovae.

Pollas is credited by the Minor Planet Center with the discovery of 26 asteroids, some co-discovered with Eric W. Elst, including the near-Earth asteroids:   (belonging to the Aten group of asteroids), 4179 Toutatis (belonging to the Apollo group of asteroids) and 9950 ESA (belonging to the Amor group of asteroids).

The main-belt asteroid 4892 Chrispollas is named in his honor.

List of discovered minor planets

References 
 

1947 births
Discoverers of asteroids

20th-century French astronomers
Living people